Robert John Bardo (born January 2, 1970) is an American man serving life imprisonment without parole after being convicted in October 1991 for the July 18, 1989, murder of American actress and model Rebecca Schaeffer, whom he had stalked for three years.

Early life 
Bardo was the youngest of seven children. His mother was Japanese and his father Philip was a non-commissioned officer in the United States Air Force. The family moved frequently and eventually settled in Tucson, Arizona, in 1983. Bardo reportedly had a troubled childhood. He was abused by one of his siblings and placed in foster care after he threatened to commit suicide. Bardo's family had a history of mental illness, and he was diagnosed with bipolar disorder. 

At the age of 15, he was institutionalized for a month to treat emotional problems. Bardo dropped out of Pueblo Magnet High School in the ninth grade and began working as a janitor at Jack in the Box. In the 18 months prior to Schaeffer's murder, Bardo had been arrested three times on charges that included domestic violence and disorderly conduct. Bardo's neighbors also said that he had exhibited unexplained strange and threatening behavior toward them.

Murder 
Prior to developing an obsession with Schaeffer, Bardo had stalked child peace activist Samantha Smith before her death in a 1985 plane crash. After writing numerous letters to Schaeffer, Bardo attempted to gain access to the set of the CBS television series My Sister Sam, in which Schaeffer played a starring role. Ultimately, he obtained her home address via a detective agency, which in turn tracked it via California Department of Motor Vehicles records. On July 18, 1989, Bardo confronted Schaeffer at her home, angry that she had appeared in a sex scene in the film Scenes from the Class Struggle in Beverly Hills; in his eyes, she had "lost her innocence" and became "another Hollywood whore". He visited her at her apartment and told her he was a big fan. 

After having been turned away by Schaeffer, Bardo stopped at a diner for breakfast, only to return to the apartment about an hour later, again ringing the doorbell. When Schaeffer opened the door, Bardo shot her in the chest. Bardo was arrested in Tucson, Arizona, where he was observed walking aimlessly in traffic.

The state prosecutor for the trial was Marcia Clark, who later became the lead prosecutor in the O. J. Simpson murder trial. Bardo was housed in a sensitive needs unit (SNU) for inmates such as gang members, notorious prisoners, and those convicted of sex crimes. During the trial, Bardo claimed the U2 song "Exit" was an influence in the murder, and the song was played in the courtroom as evidence (with Bardo lip-synching the lyrics).

Bardo's attorneys conceded that he had murdered Schaeffer, but they argued that he was mentally ill. Psychiatrist Park Dietz, testifying for the defense, said that Bardo had schizophrenia and that it was his illness that led him to commit the murder. Bardo was found guilty of first-degree murder and sentenced to life imprisonment without the possibility of parole.

Bardo carried a red paperback copy of The Catcher in the Rye when he murdered Schaeffer, which he tossed onto the roof of a building as he fled. He insisted that it was coincidental and that he was not emulating Mark David Chapman, who had also carried a copy with him when he shot and killed John Lennon on December 8, 1980. Chapman later revealed in interviews that he had received letters from Bardo before the murder of Schaeffer, in which Bardo inquired about life in prison.

Aftermath 
As a consequence of Bardo's actions and his methods of obtaining Schaeffer's address, the U.S. Congress passed the Driver's Privacy Protection Act, which prohibits state Departments of Motor Vehicles from disclosing the home addresses of state residents. After the murder, the first anti-stalking state laws were enacted in the US, including California Penal Code 646.9.

The season 2 episode of Law and Order "Star Struck" was partially based on this case.

On July 27, 2007, Bardo was stabbed 11 times on his way to breakfast in the maximum-security unit at Mule Creek State Prison in Amador County, California. Two shivs (inmate-made weapons) were found at the scene. He was treated at the UC Davis Medical Center and returned to prison, officials said. The suspect in the attack was another convict, serving 82 years to life for second-degree murder.

, Bardo is serving his life sentence at the Avenal State Prison in Avenal, California.

References

External links 
 An Innocent Life, a Heartbreaking Death  PEOPLE Magazine cover story (July 1989).

1970 births
1989 murders in the United States
20th-century American criminals
American male criminals
American people convicted of murder
American people of Japanese descent
American prisoners sentenced to life imprisonment
Crime in California
Criminals from Arizona
Criminals from California
Criminals from Los Angeles
Living people
Male murderers
People convicted of murder by California
People from Tucson, Arizona
People with bipolar disorder
People with schizophrenia
Place of birth missing (living people)
Prisoners sentenced to life imprisonment by California
Stalking